Jeffrey Roger Hartsock (born November 19, 1966) is a former Major League Baseball right-handed pitcher who played for the Chicago Cubs in 1992.

Amateur career
A native of Fairfield, Ohio, Hartsock is an alumnus of North Carolina State University, where he played college baseball for the Wolfpack from 1986 to 1988. In 1987, he played collegiate summer baseball with the Orleans Cardinals of the Cape Cod Baseball League.

Professional career
Hartsock was drafted by the Los Angeles Dodgers in the 7th round of the 1988 MLB Draft.  Prior to making his Major League debut, Hartsock would be traded to the Chicago Cubs for Steve Wilson on September 6, 1991.  He would eventually make his Major League Baseball debut with the Chicago Cubs on September 12, 1992.  Hartsock appeared in his final Major League game on September 28, 1992.

References

External links

1966 births
Living people
Baseball players from Ohio
Chicago Cubs players
Major League Baseball pitchers
NC State Wolfpack baseball players
Orleans Firebirds players
People from Fairfield, Ohio
Great Falls Dodgers players
Bakersfield Dodgers players
San Antonio Missions players
Albuquerque Dukes players
Iowa Cubs players
Phoenix Firebirds players
Orlando Cubs players
Louisville Redbirds players
Sportspeople from the Cincinnati metropolitan area